The Dude Ranger is a 1934 American Western film directed by Edward F. Cline based on the novel by Zane Grey. Parts of the film were shot in Johnson Canyon, Springdale, Zion National Park, and the Virgin River in Utah. The Grand Canyon was also a filming location.

Cast
George O'Brien as Ernest "Dude" Selby
Irene Hervey as Ann Hepburn
LeRoy Mason as Dale Hyslip
Syd Saylor as "Nebraska" Kemp
Henry Hall as Sam Hepburn
Jim Mason as "Hawk" Stevens
Sid Jordan as Henchman Dunn
Alma Chester as Martha (the Housekeeper)
Lloyd Ingraham as Lawyer John Beckett

Soundtrack

References

External links

1934 films
1930s Western (genre) comedy films
American action comedy films
American black-and-white films
American Western (genre) comedy films
Films based on American novels
Films based on Western (genre) novels
Films shot in Utah
Films produced by Sol Lesser
1930s action comedy films
Films based on works by Zane Grey
Fox Film films
1934 comedy films
1930s English-language films
1930s American films